Adébóyè is a surname of Yoruba origin, meaning "the crown or royalty meets with chieftaincy".

Notable people with the surname include:

 Enoch Adeboye (born 1942), Nigerian pastor
 Gbenga Adeboye (1959–2003), Nigerian singer, comedian, radio presenter and master of ceremony
 Kayode Rufus Adeboye (born 1946), Nigerian Mathematician
 Alabi-Fatile Adeboye (born 1995), Nigerian Political Scientist, Author and Inspirational Speaker

See also
 Adeboyejo

Yoruba-language surnames